Under Two Flags is a 1916 American silent drama film directed by J. Gordon Edwards and starring Theda Bara. It was the second adaptation of the best selling 1867 novel Under Two Flags by Ouida and the subsequent stage play version by Arthur Shirley. The film is now considered to be lost.

The film was re-released by Fox Film Corporation in January 1919. The novel/play was adapted to the screen for a third time in 1922 as Under Two Flags by The Universal Film Manufacturing Company and a fourth time in 1936 again as Under Two Flags by 20th Century Fox.

Plot
As described in a film magazine, British nobleman Bertie Cecil (Heyes) takes upon himself the blame for his brother's forgeries and, when supposed dead, enlists in the French Foreign Legion, serving in Algiers. There he wins the friendship of Emir, a native whose wife he had saved from the lust of his commanding officer.

Old friends visit Algiers and recognize Bertie, and urge him to return and claim his own. His refusal leads to a scene where he strikes his commanding officer, and for this he is condemned to death. Cigarette, the "daughter of the regiment," rides to obtain a pardon for Bertie and makes a terrific trip through a sand storm. She arrives too late with the reprieve, but just in time to receive in her own body the bullets intended for Bertie.

Cast
 Theda Bara as Cigarette
 Herbert Heyes as Bertie Cecil
 Stuart Holmes as Chateauroye (Holmes also reprised this role in the 1922 version starring Priscilla Dean)
 Stanhope Wheatcroft as Berkeley Cecil
 Joseph Crehan as Rake
 Charles Craig as Rockingham
 Claire Whitney as Venitia

See also
List of lost films
1937 Fox vault fire

References

External links

1916 films
1916 drama films
1916 lost films
Fox Film films
Silent American drama films
American silent feature films
American black-and-white films
Films based on British novels
Films based on works by Ouida
Films directed by J. Gordon Edwards
Films set in deserts
Films about the French Foreign Legion
Lost American films
Lost drama films
1910s American films
1910s English-language films
English-language drama films